Ahmed Boukhari (born 1938 in Safi) is a Moroccan former agent of Cab-1, the political cell of the DST (the Moroccan internal secret service). He claims to have taken part in the operation that masterminded the abduction and liquidation of Mehdi Ben Barka, and is as such one of the last surviving possible witnesses in the Benbarka Affair.

Ben Barka Affair

Although he was not present at the crime scene, he had to process all the information on the operation. He claims that CIA agents were involved, a certain Colonel Martin. Boukhari claimed in his confessions that Ben Barka's body was transported secretly to Morocco and his corpse was dissolved in a bath of acid. However, pro-government newspapers in Morocco claimed that Boukhari is a fraud and a liar. The movie "J'ai vu tuer Ben Barka" has been based partly on this book.

Publications
Boukhari authored two books, one about the Ben Barka affair, title Le Secret and the other Raisons d'état (published in 2005), where he recounts the operations of the DST from the 1960s to the 1980s during the repression of various dissident movements, mainly from the socialist left. He remains the only insider who has ever published about the DST.

Arrest, trial and harassment by authorities
Because of his revelations, Boukhari had many problems with the justice in Morocco. Including defamation lawsuits by former employees of the DST and the Moroccan Ministry of the Interior, whom he mentioned by name in his book, as well as other common affairs such as dishonoured cheques, which were claimed to be used against him in order to sentence him in a non-political affair.

The Moroccan authorities have refused to issue a passport for Boukhari, which he requested in 2001 in order to be able to testify in France before the judge investigating the Ben Barka disappearance. After a lawsuit in the administrative court, Boukhari was finally granted a passport in early 2006.

References

Human rights abuses in Morocco
Living people
1938 births
People from Safi, Morocco
People of Moroccan intelligence agencies
Moroccan whistleblowers
Moroccan prisoners and detainees